Ahmed Butt is a Pakistani model and a film actor.

Early life and career
Ahmed Butt was born at Lahore, Pakistan on 18 November, 1975.
Ever since they got married in 2004, their turbulent relationship has been in the news with many separations and then marital reconciliations later. On 2 November 2016, their latest reconciliation was reported in  Pakistani newspapers.

Ahmed Butt denied the allegation by his wife, Humaira, that he was demanding 30 million rupees from her. He claimed that she owed that money to him in exchange of a flat among them.

Finally in April 2019, both Humaira Arshad and her husband Ahmad Butt were able to agree to a divorce after mutual understanding. Ahmed Butt got the custody of their young son and had plans to move to the United States with him in the future, whereas Humaira Arshad would be able to focus on her singing career in Pakistan.

Filmography

References

External links

Pakistani male film actors
Pakistani male models
Kashmiri male models
Living people
Male actors from Lahore
Kashmiri actors
Pakistani people of Kashmiri descent
1975 births